Cyclone, in comics, may refer to: 
 
Cyclone (Marvel Comics), a number of Marvel Comics characters
Cyclone (DC Comics), a DC Comics character
Cyclone!, an Australian superhero anthology comic book

See also
Cyclone (disambiguation)